The 2023 Men's League1 Ontario season will be the ninth season of play for League1 Ontario, a Division 3 men's soccer league in the Canadian soccer pyramid and the highest level of soccer based in the Canadian province of Ontario. Following the 2023 season, the league will split into three divisions with promotion and relegation between them.

Vaughan Azzurri are the defending league champions, and have qualified for the 2023 Canadian Championship.

Clubs
With the exception of Pickering FC, 21 of the 22 clubs that took part in the 2022 season will participate in 2023. Because of the format changes planned for the following year, the league imposed a one-year moratorium on any new teams joining the league.

Premier Division
On March 7, 2023, League1 Ontario announced that the Men's Premier Division season would begin on April 13 (later revised to April 12).

Playoffs

Future format and changes

Starting in 2024, the league will split into a multi-division format with promotion and relegation between them. Twelve teams will take part in the first-tier League1 Premier, 10 teams in the second-tier League1 Championship, and all new expansion teams as well as reserve sides in a third-tier League2 Ontario. 

The initial assignment of teams in the 2024 season is done by using the points obtained in the previous two years. The points from the 2022 season (weighted at 75%) will be added to the points teams obtain in the 2023 season (weighted at 100%) to determine the placements.

U21 Reserve Division
The Reserve Division will return with each Premier Division club fielding one or more teams, as well as some other OPDL clubs that do not operate a League1 Ontario team.

North East Division

North West Division

Central Division

South West Division

Playoffs

U19 Reserve Division

Central Division

West Division

Playoffs

References

External links 

League1 Ontario
League1 Ontario seasons
Ontario